Akiel Cooper (born 26 November 1990) is a Trinidad and Tobago cricketer. He made his first-class debut for Trinidad and Tobago in the 2016–17 Regional Four Day Competition on 7 April 2017.

References

External links
 

1990 births
Living people
Trinidad and Tobago cricketers